A Volcanic Ash Advisory Center (VAAC) is a group of experts responsible for coordinating and disseminating information on atmospheric volcanic ash clouds that may endanger aviation. As at 2019, there are nine Volcanic Ash Advisory Centers located around the world, each one focusing on a particular geographical region. Their analyses are made public in the form of volcanic ash advisories (VAAs), involving expertise analysis of satellite observations, ground and pilot observations and interpretation of ash dispersion models.  

The worldwide network of Volcanic Ash Advisory Centers was set up by the International Civil Aviation Organization (ICAO), an agency of the United Nations, as part of the International Airways Volcano Watch (IAVW), an international set of arrangements for monitoring and providing warnings to aircraft of volcanic ash.  The operations and development of the IAVW are coordinated by the Meteorology Panel (METP) established by the ICAO Air Navigation Commission.   The individual VAACs are run as part of national weather forecasting organisations of the country where they are based, e.g. the US National Weather Service or the British Met Office.

Precedents
The centers were set up in the 1990s to improve forecasts of the locations of ash clouds from volcanic eruptions following incidents where commercial aircraft had flown through volcanic ash resulting in the loss of engine power. British Airways Flight 9, a Boeing 747, lost power to all four engines in 1982 over Indonesia after an eruption of Mount Galunggung. KLM Flight 867, another Boeing 747, again lost power to all engines in 1989 over Alaska after Mount Redoubt erupted.  It was recognised following these and other incidents that volcanic ash was a danger to commercial aviation and that the only way to ensure that there would be no loss of an aircraft was to alert pilots in a timely manner to divert their flight around the cloud.

Locations

There are nine VAAC locations each with a defined area to monitor.  The centers coordinate with adjacent VAAC, flight control centers within and adjacent to their area as well as meteorological offices within and adjacent to their area of operation.

The areas covered by the VAAC are set either by coordinates or by Flight Information Regions (FIR) that are internationally agreed as part of the IAVW program of the ICAO and the areas that each has responsibility is set out in the Handbook on the IAVW.  

The areas of responsibility for VAAC cover the entire world.

Volcanic ash advisories
When an ash cloud is detected, the VAAC will gather all the available observations, using them in conjunction with both ash dispersion and numerical weather models, to forecast the path and evolution of the ash cloud.  They will then issue a volcanic ash advisory (VAA) to aviation and meteorological offices as stated within the Handbook on the IAVW.  This will be in the format of a text based message, with a corresponding graphic.

Within the advisory the following information will be provided: the name of the volcano, the country/region, location and summit elevation of the volcano, the source of the information, e.g. satellite or pilot observation, details of the eruption including time of day in UTC and date of the eruption, details of the ash cloud including the vertical extent (in flight levels) and horizontal extent, detail on the current movement of the ash cloud, forecast movement and evolution of the cloud for 6, 12 and 18 hours ahead following the time of the advisory, any remarks by the VAAC and finally the next update time.

See also
 Mount Pelée
 Peléan eruption
 Plinian eruption

References

External links
 WMO Aeronautical Meteorology Programme
 WMO Aeronautical Meteorology Programme (New)
 The Meteorology Panel (METP)

Volcanology
Aviation risks
Aviation meteorology
Volcano monitoring